Pétur or Petur is a given name. Notable people with the name include:

 Petur Alberg (1885–1940), Faroese violin player and songwriter from Tórshavn
 Pétur Blöndal (1944–2015), Icelandic congressman in the Icelandic Independence Party
 Pétur Eyþórsson (born 1978), glima champion, having won the glima grettisbelt multiple times
 Petur Gabrovski (1898–1947), Bulgarian politician who briefly served as Prime Minister during the Second World War
 Pétur Guðmundsson (athlete) (born 1962), retired male shot putter from Iceland
 Pétur Guðmundsson (basketball) (born 1958), retired Icelandic professional basketball player
 Pétur Gunnarsson (born 1947), Icelandic writer from Reykjavík
 Petur Hliddal (born 1945), American sound engineer
 Pétur Marteinsson (born 1973), retired Icelandic football player
 Pétur Ormslev (born 1958), retired football midfielder
 Pétur Pétursson (born 1959), retired Icelandic footballer who was active as a forward
 Pétur Pétursson (bishop) (1808–1891), Icelandic Lutheran bishop
 Pétur Sigurgeirsson (1919–2010), the Bishop of Iceland from 1981 until 1989
 Pétur Þorsteinsson (born 1955), Icelandic neologist, youth-leader and vicar of the Lutheran church
 Petur Tryggvi (born 1956), Icelandic gold and silversmith

Icelandic masculine given names

sv:Pétur